Vento Chiaro is a wind quintet founded in 1997 at the Peabody Conservatory of Music in Baltimore, Maryland and now based in the greater Boston area.

History
The quintet was founded in 1997 by flautist Johanna Goldstein at the Peabody Conservatory of Music in Baltimore, Maryland. It relocated to the Boston area in 1999 when it became the ensemble-in-residence the Longy School of Music in Cambridge, Massachusetts. Since 2002 it has served on the faculty of the Boston University Tanglewood Institute's Young Artists Wind Ensemble. In 2008, the ensemble released their debut recording, Vento Chiaro: Music for Wind Quintet on Ongaku Records.

Members

The current members of Vento Chiaro are:
Ona Jonaityte (flute)
Elizabeth England (oboe)
Chi-Ju Juliet Lai (clarinet)
Sam Childers (bassoon)
Anne Howarth (horn)

Awards
Saunderson Award at the Coleman Chamber Music Competition.
Silver Medal at the Fischoff National Chamber Music Competition in 2000.

References

External links
Vento Chiaro official website
 Audio: Vento Chiaro in concert  from WGBH Radio, Boston

American instrumental musical groups
1997 establishments in Maryland
Wind quintets
Musical groups established in 1997